Heidegger on Concepts, Freedom, and Normativity is a 2014 book by the philosopher Sacha Golob, in which the author provides an account of the arguments and concepts characterizing the philosopher Martin Heidegger's early thought and examines their positions both in contemporary analytic philosophy and the history of philosophy. He argues against existing interpretations of Heidegger on intentionality and believes that Heidegger emphasizes a unique position regarding conceptual and representational content.

References

External links 
 Heidegger on Concepts, Freedom, and Normativity

2014 non-fiction books
Cambridge University Press books
English-language books
Philosophy of mind literature
Theses
Works about Martin Heidegger